M-22 are a British-German DJ and producer duo consisting of Matt James and Frank Sanders. On March 22, the duo met, through a joint production, which is the reason for their stage name.

History 
On March 22, 2015, the duo met during a joint production in Canada. James and Sanders liked each other instantly. On the same day, they produced their first single, "Good to Be Loved". In April 2015, the duo released the track "Sometime" which peaked in the UK Club Chart at #6. The song was selected by the Sarah-Jane Crawford Show (BBC1 Xtra) as 'Record of the Week'. Their debut single was released on 22 May 2015 and reached the iTunes Top 50 chart. On EDM.com, the song made it to #5 on its chart. 
Several DJs supported the track; Tiësto, Don Diablo and Robin Schulz played the song several times in their radio shows.

Robin Schulz worked with M-22 and produced the song "Love Me Loud" featuring Aleesia.  The song was included in Schulz' 15-track album Sugar, released in August 2015.

The duo produced remixes for Avicii, Sigala, Sigma, Axwell & Ingrosso, Deepend and Sam Feldt.

Alongside Axwell and Ingrosso, they played at the Refune Label Night in Ibiza in August 2016. In October 2016, they reached gold status in Sweden for their single, "Somewhere New".

Discography

Singles

Other appearances

Remixes
2018
 Tiësto and Dzeko featuring Preme and Post Malone — "Jackie Chan" (M-22 Remix)

2019
 Dimitri Vegas & Like Mike featuring Era Istrefi - "Selfish" (M-22 Remix)
 Jonas Blue featuring Theresa Rex - "What I Like About You" (M-22 Remix)
 Loïc Nottet - "On Fire" (M-22 Remix)
 Little Mix - "Bounce Back" (M-22 Remix)

2020
 Bow Anderson - "Sweater" (M-22 Remix)
 Katy Perry - "Smile" (M-22 Remix)

2021
 Craig David and MNEK - "Who You Are" (M-22 Remix)

References

Musical groups established in 2015
Electronic music duos